The Barnroom Sessions is an EP by Dum Dums vocalist Josh Doyle. This EP is currently only available at SpeakerHeart.com and JoshDoyle.com. This EP was originally recorded as "Barnroom Demos" under the band name "Entrace Thesis".

Track listing
"7 Year Itch" - 4:20
"Can't Please Myself" - 2:50
"Last Sunset" - 4:34
"Wasp" - 3:15
"The Seeker (Part Two)" - 3:32
"The Argument" - 3:23
"This Is The News" - 3:36
"The River" - 6:34

Credits
 Vocals & guitar by Josh Doyle
 Guitar by Mark Hamilton
 Bass by Richard Johnstone
 Drums by Darren Roberts
 Drums by Ben

2002 debut EPs
Josh Doyle albums